Elise O'Dea (born 4 September 1991) is an Australian rules footballer playing for the Carlton Football Club in the AFL Women's (AFLW). She served as Melbourne co-captain for the 2019 season.

Early life 
O'Dea was born in Canberra in the Australian Capital Territory (ACT) to a family of Melbourne Football Club supporters and started playing football at fourteen years of age when she joined the Belconnen Magpies Football Club women's team. She made her senior debut in round one of the 2006 season against Ainslie in the AFL Canberra Women's competition. She was selected as part of the ACT representative teams in 2006, 2007, 2009, and 2011. O'Dea was also named part of the 2011 All-Australian women's team, and won both her club and league's best and fairest awards in 2012.

Football career 

O'Dea moved to Victoria in 2013 to join the Darebin Falcons. Wearing number 30 and playing on the wing and half forward flank, was named as part of the Victorian state teams in 2013 and 2014, and was selected to play for both the Melbourne Football Club and Western Bulldogs as part of a series of women's exhibition games.

AFL Women's
In 2016, O'Dea became the first player drafted by the Melbourne Football Club in the first AFLW draft and wore the number five guernsey in her debut season. Prior to the start of the season, she was announced as one of two vice-captains for Melbourne, alongside Melissa Hickey. She made her debut during round 1 of the 2017 season against  at Casey Fields. In the round four match against , she collected twenty-seven disposals.

At the end of the 2017 season, O'Dea was nominated by her teammates for the AFL Players' Most Valuable Player Award. She was also listed in the 2017 All-Australian team.

Melbourne signed O'Dea for the 2018 season during the trade period in May 2017.

In December 2018, O'Dea and Shelley Scott were announced as Melbourne co-captains.

Following the conclusion of the 2020 season both O'Dea and fellow Demon Maddy Guerin were traded to the Carlton Football Club in exchange for Pick 15 in the 2020 NAB AFLW Draft.

Statistics
 Statistics are correct to the end of the 2017 season.

|- style="background-color: #EAEAEA"
! scope="row" style="text-align:center" | 2017
|
| 5 || 7 || 1 || 1 || 82 || 53 || 135 || 20 || 32 || 0.1 || 0.1 || 11.7 || 7.6 || 19.3 || 2.9 || 4.6
|- class="sortbottom"
! colspan=3| Career
! 7
! 1
! 1
! 82
! 53
! 135
! 20
! 32
! 0.1
! 0.1
! 11.7
! 7.6
! 19.3
! 2.9
! 4.6
|}

Personal life 
Outside football, O'Dea works as an accountant.

References

External links 

1991 births
Melbourne Football Club (AFLW) players
Sportspeople from Canberra
Living people
Australian rules footballers from Victoria (Australia)
All-Australians (AFL Women's)
Australian accountants
Darebin Falcons players
Carlton Football Club (AFLW) players